The Khammouane bent-toed gecko (Cyrtodactylus khammouanensis)  is a species of gecko that is endemic to Laos.

References 

Cyrtodactylus
Reptiles described in 2014